Thorsten Brötzmann is a German record producer, composer, and arranger. He collaborated with No Angels, Bro'Sis, Christina Stürmer, Monrose, Jeanette, Nina Kraljić, Oonagh, Alexander Klaws, and Modern Talking.

Selected production discography

Number-one singles

External links
 TBMusik.de

German record producers
21st-century German composers
Eurodance musicians
Living people
Year of birth missing (living people)